Elad Leon Roisman is an American lawyer from Maine who is a former commissioner of the U.S. Securities and Exchange Commission.

Education 

Roisman received his Bachelor of Arts from Cornell University and his Juris Doctor from the Boston University School of Law.

Career 

Early in his career, Roisman served as chief counsel at NYSE Euronext and as an associate at the law firm of Milbank in New York. Roisman  went on to serve as counsel to SEC Commissioner Daniel M. Gallagher. He then served as chief counsel of the Senate Committee on Banking, Housing, and Urban Affairs. While serving the committee he drafted several pieces of legislation including the Economic Growth, Regulatory Relief and Consumer Protection Act.

U.S. Securities and Exchange Commission 

In 2018, President Donald Trump nominated Roisman to be a commissioner of the U.S. Securities and Exchange Commission to the seat vacated by Michael Piwowar, whose term expired.  On August 23, 2018, his nomination was reported out of the Senate Committee on Banking, Housing and Urban Affairs. On September 5, 2018, his nomination was confirmed by a vote of 84–15. On September 11, 2018, he was sworn into office by Chairman Jay Clayton. On December 23, 2020, President Trump designated Roisman as Acting Chairman, effective December 24, and he served until January 20, 2021.

Personal life 

Roisman is a registered Republican.

References 

Living people
20th-century American lawyers
21st-century American lawyers
Year of birth missing (living people)
Place of birth missing (living people)
Boston University School of Law alumni
Cornell University alumni
Maryland Republicans
New York (state) lawyers
United States Senate lawyers
U.S. Securities and Exchange Commission personnel